Acanthothrips is a genus of thrips in the family Phlaeothripidae. The majority of species in the genus occur in the New World. One species has a holarctic distribution and another species is limited to northern Europe.

Species
 Acanthothrips albivittatus
 Acanthothrips albovittatus
 Acanthothrips amoenus
 Acanthothrips argentifer
 Acanthothrips candidus
 Acanthothrips folsomi
 Acanthothrips grandis
 Acanthothrips itzanus
 Acanthothrips nodicornis
 Acanthothrips palmi
 Acanthothrips perileucus
 Acanthothrips priesneri
 Acanthothrips vittatus

References

Phlaeothripidae
Thrips
Thrips genera